Israel Harold "Izzy" Asper  (August 11, 1932– October 7, 2003) was a Canadian tax lawyer and media magnate. He was the founder and owner of the now-defunct TV and media company CanWest Global Communications Corp and father to its former CEO and President Leonard Asper, former director and corporate secretary Gail Asper, as well as former Executive Vice President David Asper. He was also the leader of the Manitoba Liberal Party from 1970 to 1975 and is credited with the idea and vision to establish the Canadian Museum for Human Rights.

Personal life and education 
Israel Asper was born on August 11, 1932, to a Jewish family in Minnedosa, Manitoba, the son of musicians Leon Asper and Cecilia Swet, who had emigrated from Ukraine in the 1920s.

He married Ruth Miriam "Babs" Bernstein  on May 27, 1956, at Shaarey Zedek Synagogue, Winnipeg.

Asper attended the University of Manitoba Law School in Winnipeg, where he received his law degree in 1957 and was called to the bar shortly thereafter in July, eventually receiving a Master of Laws in 1964.

On October 7, 2003, Asper died in St. Boniface Hospital at the age of 71 after suffering a heart attack. He was buried in the Shaarey Zedek Cemetery in Winnipeg in the presence of 1,500 mourners, including Prime Minister Jean Chrétien and leading politicians.

Career 
He founded the firm of Asper, Freedman & Co. in 1959, and was also a partner and co-founder of the firm Buchwald, Asper, Henteleff (now Pitblado LLP) along with Harold Buchwald and Yude Henteleff.

In 1970, he wrote The Benson Iceberg: A Critical Analysis of the White Paper on Tax Reform in Canada.

Also that year, Asper was elected leader of the Manitoba Liberal Party (defeating university professor John Nesbitt). Asper represented a right-libertarian strain within the party. In the Manitoba election of 1973, he promoted a laissez-faire economy, and advocated the elimination of the welfare state. He also advocated the public financing of election campaigns, to ensure that politics would not be dominated entirely by monied interests. Moreover, as leader of the Manitoba Liberals, he supported the provincial Bill of Rights, and would go on to seek inclusion of the Canadian Charter of Rights and Freedoms in the Constitution Act of 1982. His Liberals won only five seats, and Asper was elected in Wolseley by only four votes. He resigned as party leader and MLA in 1975, though he continued to support the Manitoba Liberal Party in later years.

His media empire subsequently began with the Winnipeg television station CKND-TV in 1975. Shortly after, in 1977, Asper formed CanWest Global Communications Corporation, which grew to encompass the Global Television Network, among other assets. In 2000, CanWest bought the media holdings of Conrad Black's Hollinger Inc. for $3.2 billion, allowing Asper control of the Southam newspaper group, over 60 Canadian newspapers (including the daily National Post) as well as several important offshore newspapers and journals.

Asper was noted for his fierce loyalty to Manitoba and western Canada, refusing enticements to move east to Toronto.

He was also a noted philanthropist, making major donations to the areas of culture, arts, and education; to expand on these endeavours, the Asper Foundation was established in 1983 in Winnipeg. In 1997, to focus on his philanthropic career, Asper resigned as CEO of CanWest to become Executive Chairman. In 2001, Asper donated CA$5 million to the St. Boniface Hospital & Research Foundation.

He was a prominent member of Canada's Jewish community as well, and a vocal supporter for the State of Israel. In this regard, among other positions, he was a member of the Board of Governors of the Jewish Foundation of Manitoba; an Honorary Governor at the Hebrew University of Jerusalem; and an Honorary Chairman of the Jewish Community Campus of Winnipeg Inc. (The Asper Campus).

Asper was also a close friend of many of Canada's prominent political and business elite, including Jean Chrétien and Paul Martin. Controversially, Asper's newspaper chain fired journalist Russell Mills when he wrote an article that was critical of Chretien and demanded he resign.

Views on Israel
As a youth, growing up in Winnipeg, Asper joined the socialist-Zionist youth movement Hashomer Hatzair which supported the creation of a binational state in Mandatory Palestine. As a result of the 1948 Arab–Israeli War, Asper's views on Zionism swung to the right and he came a supporter of Jabotinskyism and Irgun leader Menachem Begin and an opponent of Labour Zionism, and remained so for the rest of his life. Asper said of his views ""because the Labour Zionists got control of the educational institutions, and of the government. I utterly supported Begin from the time I was 12 or 13. Without him and his guerrilla revolt against the British, there would be no Israel."

Canadian Museum for Human Rights 

Israel Asper first came with the idea to build the Canadian Museum for Human Rights (CMHR) on 18 July 2000. Asper spent the next three years towards making the CMHR a reality, and had a thorough feasibility study conducted by museum experts from around Canada.

In 2003, Asper established a private charitable organization to build the CMHR, called the Friends of the Canadian Museum for Human Rights. On April 17, the 21st anniversary of the Charter of Rights and Freedoms, an event was held at The Forks in Winnipeg where Asper first publicly announced the intent to create the CMHR. The announcement included considerable funding commitments from the governments of Canada, Manitoba, and Winnipeg, as well as land donated by the Forks Renewal Corporation. Prime Minister Jean Chrétien committed the first $30 million towards the capital cost, and private fundraising was soon overseen by the Friends of the CMHR.

Later that year, on October 7, on his way to announce the architectural competition in Vancouver for the CMHR’s design, Asper died suddenly at the age of 71. His family along with the Asper Foundation's executive director vowed to continue to develop the museum. Two weeks later, the groundbreaking ceremony was held at The Forks and the architectural competition announced.

In 2014, a stretch of road in front of the CMHR was named Israel Asper Way.

Accolades and recognition 
 1975 – appointed Queen’s Counsel
 1979 – recipient of University of Manitoba Alumni Jubilee Award, Outstanding 25 Year Graduate
 1989, 1991 – elected "Manitoba Business Entrepreneur of the Year"
 1992 – Canadian Association of Broadcasters Gold Ribbon Award for Broadcast Excellence
 1993 – recipient of B’nai Brith International Award of Merit
 1995 – inducted as an Officer of the Order of Canada
 1995 – inducted into the Canadian Broadcast Hall of Fame
 1996 – chosen "Western Canadian Entrepreneur of the Year"
 1997 – inducted as Laureate of Canadian Business Hall of Fame
 1997 – recipient of International Distinguished Entrepreneur Award, University of Manitoba, School of Business
 1999 – inducted into Winnipeg Citizens Hall of Fame
 1999 – recipient of North American Broadcasters Association International Achievement Award
 2000 – inducted as a Founding Member of the Order of Manitoba
 2000 – The Faculty of Management at the University of Manitoba renamed itself the Asper School of Business.
 2001 – recipient of the Edmund C. Bovey Award presented by the Canadian Business and Arts Council
 2001 – recipient of Outstanding Philanthropist of the Year Award from the Association of Fundraising Professionals, Manitoba Chapter
 2001 – recipient of Winnipeg Philanthropist of the Year Award
 2002 – awarded Queen Elizabeth II Jubilee Medal
 2004 (posthumous) – received a lifetime achievement award from the Radio Television News Directors Association of Canada.
 2014 (posthumous) – a stretch of road in front of the Canadian Museum for Human Rights was named Israel Asper Way.

Honorary titles and degrees 
 1985 – Honorary Fellow, Hebrew University of Jerusalem
 1986 – Honorary Lieutenant-Colonel in the Canadian Militia
 1997 – Honorary Chairman of the Board, Asper Jewish Community Campus
 1997 – Honorary Chairman of the Board, Asper Centre for Entrepreneurship, University of Manitoba
 1998 – Honorary Doctor of Laws and Letters, University of Manitoba
 1999 – Honorary Doctor of Philosophy, Hebrew University of Jerusalem
 2002 – Honorary Doctor of Laws Degree, McMaster University, Montreal

The Asper Foundation 

The Asper Foundation is a philanthropic organization in Winnipeg. Claiming to be founded on the Jewish philosophies of tzedakah ('charitable giving') and tikkun olam ('repair of the world'), the Foundation provides general support to Winnipeg's Jewish community as well as supporting the broader community, particularly in western Canada, in areas of culture, education, medical research, community development, and human rights.

The Asper Foundation received its heraldic emblem by the Canadian Heraldic Authority in January 2003. As of 2019, the Foundation has $192 million in assets, and is one of Canada’s largest private foundations.

The Foundation was established in 1983 by Israel and Babs Asper, created from the wealth they had generated via CanWest, to build upon theirs and their family’s philanthropic endeavours. In 1997, to focus on this philanthropy, Israel Asper resigned as CEO of CanWest, remaining as Executive Chairman instead.

Beneficiaries 
Some initiatives in Winnipeg supported by the Foundation include the Asper Foundation Human Rights and Holocaust Studies Program, the Asper School of Business at the University of Manitoba, the Asper Jewish Community Campus, the Saint Boniface Hospital Clinical Research Institute, Winnipeg Harvest, the Lyric Theatre in Assiniboine Park, and several programs with the United Way in Winnipeg.

On 22 November 2000, the Foundation donated $10 million each to The Winnipeg Foundation and the Jewish Foundation of Manitoba. In October 2019, the Foundation announced a gift of CA$5-million to the University of Manitoba to establish the "Asper Foundation Entrance Bursary," a $1,000 entrance bursary program available to students in any faculty or school. In early 2021, the Foundation made a $5-million gift to the Canadian Friends of the Hebrew University of Israel (HUJI) to expand the "Asper HUJI Innovate" startup accelerator program at the University.

The Asper Foundation also created and sourced the funding for Canada’s 5th national museum, the Canadian Museum for Human Rights.

The Foundation's projects in Israel include the Centre for Entrepreneurship at HUJI, Community Action Centres and ‘Edible Gardens’ across Israel, a New Media Centre at Interdisciplinary Center Herzliya, and Yad Vashem’s International School for Holocaust Studies. , the Asper Foundation is currently leading the development of the World’s Jewish Museum, designed by Canadian–American architect Frank Gehry, in Tel Aviv.

References

Further reading 
  Edge, Marc. 2007. Asper Nation: Canada's Most Dangerous Media Company. New Star Books. ISBN 1554200326.
  – biography
 Miracle at the Forks: Companion Video Series

External links 
 
 The Asper Foundation
 Canadian Museum for Human Rights
 Asper at The Canadian Encyclopedia 2020, Historica Canada

1932 births
2003 deaths
Izzy
Canadian libertarians
Canadian television company founders
Canadian newspaper chain founders
Canadian King's Counsel
Canadian people of Ukrainian-Jewish descent
Canadian television executives
Jewish Canadian philanthropists
Jewish Canadian politicians
Lawyers in Manitoba
Manitoba Liberal Party MLAs
Members of the Order of Manitoba
Officers of the Order of Canada
People from Minnedosa, Manitoba
University of Manitoba alumni
Global Television Network people
20th-century Canadian newspaper publishers (people)
Robson Hall alumni
20th-century philanthropists